Robert Scott ( – January 9, 2015) was a New York Times best-selling American non-fiction author who wrote 20 true crime books.

Education 
Scott attended Diablo Valley College.

Career 
In the late 1990s, after reading newspaper accounts about a series of local murders, Scott, a delivery company driver at the time, began researching and writing a book about a couple, James Daveggio and Michelle Michaud, who committed murders in the county in which Scott lived. In 2001, Kensington Books, as a Pinnacle Books imprint, released his book about the couple's murderous crime spree, titled Rope Burns. In November 2012, Scott appeared on an Investigation Discovery episode of "Deadly Women" about the case.

His 16th book, Shattered Innocence, about kidnap victim Jaycee Dugard, made the New York Times Best Seller list in paperback nonfiction the week of October 2, 2011.

TruTV's "Crime Library" recounted Scott's book Like Father Like Son about the 2000 murder of 9-year-old Krystal Steadman.

He contributed chapters for two anthologies, Masters of True Crime, released in 2012 by Prometheus Books, and Murder Past, Murder Present, released in 2009 by Twilight Times.

Scott appeared in the second series of the TV show Nothing Personal about the Todd Garton case and the plan to kill his wife, Carole Garton, about which Scott wrote the book Kill Or Be Killed. He also appeared in the 2010 documentary Too Young to Kill: 15 Shocking Crimes to talk about 14-year-old Cody Posey and the murder of Posey's father.

Awards 
In 2007, Scott was awarded Best East Bay True-Crime Author by the East Bay Express newspaper.

His book Shattered Innocence was named a New York Times bestseller in October 2011.

Personal life
Scott died at his home in Northern California on January 9, 2015.

Books

Non-fiction 
 Rope Burns (2001; rereleased 2010), Pinnacle Books.
 Savage (2002), Pinnacle Books.
 Like Father, Like Son (2002), Pinnacle Books.
 Dangerous Attraction (2003), Pinnacle Books.
 Married To Murder (2004), Pinnacle Books.
 Kill Or Be Killed (2004), Pinnacle Books.
 Unholy Sacrifice (2005), Pinnacle Books.
 Monster Slayer (2005), Pinnacle Books.
 Deadfall (2006), Pinnacle Books.
 Killer Dad: Husband, Father, Murderer (2007), Pinnacle Books.
 Driven To Murder (2008), Pinnacle Books.
 Lust To Kill (2009), Pinnacle Books.
 Rivers of Blood (2009), Pinnacle Books.
 Most Wanted Killer (2010), Pinnacle Books.
 Blood Frenzy (2010), Pinnacle Books.
 Shattered Innocence (2011), Pinnacle Books.
 The Last Time We Saw Her (2012), Pinnacle Books.
 And Then She Killed Him (2012), Pinnacle Books.
 The Girl in the Leaves (2012), Berkley Books.
 Kill the Ones You Love (2013), Pinnacle Books. 
 A Season of Madness (2013), Pinnacle Books.

References

External links 
 Publisher's author page
 
 Book 'Em Vol. 30: Crime Magazine's Review of True-Crime Books, June 8, 2010
 Death announcement

Writers from California
American male non-fiction writers
American non-fiction crime writers
1940s births
2015 deaths